Four Points by Sheraton is a multinational hotel brand operated by Marriott International that targets business travelers and small conventions. As of June 30, 2020, Marriott operated 291 properties worldwide under the Four Points by Sheraton brand, with 53,054 rooms. In addition, Marriott had 130 planned hotels with 27,342 additional rooms.

History
In April 1995, ITT Sheraton introduced the Four Points by Sheraton brand, to replace the designation of certain hotels as Sheraton Inns. During the early 2000s, this mid-scale, moderate-rate, full-service hotel brand operated around 135 properties, across about 15 countries, but primarily in the US. 

In 1998, Starwood acquired ITT Sheraton. In 2000, Starwood relaunched Four Points by Sheraton as a premier upscale hotel chain for business and leisure travelers. The hotels initiated a Best Brews program that offers an opportunity to sample local craft beers.

In September 2016, Marriott acquired the Four Points by Sheraton brand as part of its purchase of Starwood. After the takeover, Marriott identified properties which did not meet brand standards, which were required to either renovate, or exit the brand.

Notable Properties
The Four Points by Sheraton Havana, a conversion of the existing Hotel Quinta Avenida, became the first US-managed hotel in Cuba since 1960, when it opened in June 2016. On June 5, 2020, Marriott was ordered by the U.S. Treasury to cease management of the hotel by August 31, after the Trump administration suspended Marriott's license to operate in Cuba.

Accommodations

References

External links
 

Marriott International brands
Hotels established in 1995